Clondalkin is a suburban town and townland situated  south-west of Dublin city centre, Ireland, under the administrative jurisdiction of South Dublin.  It features an 8th-century round tower that acts as a focal point for the area. Clondalkin forms part of the Dublin Mid-West Dáil constituency.

Clondalkin is also the name of a civil parish in the ancient barony of Uppercross, and is also used in relation to some local religious parishes.

History

Prehistory
Neolithic tribes first settled in the area around 7,600 years ago, taking advantage of the site's favourable location on the River Camac, overlooking the River Liffey and the inland pass between the mountains and the river. Evidence of the presence of the Cualann Celtic people (an early tribe possibly noted on as the Cauci on Ptolemy's world map) can be found in various mounds and raths.

Christian era
Clondalkin is believed to have been founded by Saint Cronan Mochua as a monastic settlement on the River Camac over 1,400 years ago (possibly late 6th or early 7th centuries). The round tower was built perhaps two centuries later (circa 790 AD) as part of the monastery. This would make it an unusual tower, as most scholars assume that the main period of their construction was between the start of the 10th century and the end of the 12th century, and that this one was built in the 10th or 11th century. By the 8th century, Saint Fugillus was Bishop of Clondalkin and noted gospel manuscripts were produced – the most famous of these being the Clondalkin mass book which is on display in Karlsruhe, Germany.

Viking arrival
Clondalkin was sacked by Vikings in 832 AD, and the monastery was burned to the ground. One of the early Norse kings of Dublin, Amlaíb Conung, built a fortress on the site in the middle of the 9th century. In 867 a force led by Cennétig mac Gaíthéne, king of Loígis, burned the fortress at Clondalkin and killed 100 of Amlaíb's followers.  The monastery was later restored and, with help from other surrounding monasteries, influenced the Viking settlers in their conversion to Christianity. The district remained under Norse control until the Viking defeat by Brian Boru at the famous Battle of Clontarf in 1014.

Norman era

Clondalkin witnessed another historic event during the Norman invasion in 1171 when there was a battle there between Richard de Clare (Strongbow) and the last High King of Ireland Ruaidhrí Ua Conchabhair.

Clondalkin is a civil parish in the ancient barony of Uppercross. An exclave of the parish, consisting of the single townland of Blundelstown, is located in the neighbouring barony of Newcastle to the west.

17th century and beyond
Centuries later, Clondalkin was the scene for some of the fighting in the 1641 Rebellion, when the Gaelic Irish in Ulster, and later in the rest of the kingdom, and the Old English in the Pale of Leinster rebelled against rule from Westminster. (Ireland had its own parliament at this time, but it was severely limited in its powers, e.g. by Poynings' Law.)

Clondalkin Paper Mill was established at the start of the 19th century by Thomas Seery and Son. Having changed ownership over the years, activity peaked during the First World War as the focus moved to war production. Productivity slowed until the mill closed its doors for the last time in 1987.

Historical features
A focal point for Clondalkin is the eighth-century round tower, one of the four remaining towers in the historic County Dublin. Acknowledged as one of the oldest in the country, it is 25.6 metres high and has its original conical cap. In July 2017, The Round Tower Heritage Centre opened in the village core, the result of a €3.5 million investment into enhancing the historic Round Tower with an interactive interpretive centre and a monastic-style garden. The centre addresses the history of Clondalkin and the round tower. 

Clondalkin is also home to St Brigid's Well, which is said to have been established as a well for baptising pagans by Saint Brigid in the 5th century. It was believed that the well possessed powers of healing.

Tully's Castle is a castle and a National Monument.

Amenities and businesses
The Clondalkin area had a population of approximately 46,000 as of 2016. Retail facilities serving the population include branches of four major supermarket chains. The village centre also has several small businesses including solicitors, restaurants, pubs, hairdressers and pharmacies.

Clondalkin has a branch of South Dublin Libraries in a building which used to house a Carnegie Library. North Clondalkin Library, opposite the Immaculate Heart of Saint Mary's Church, was due to open in late 2019. There is also a post office.

Wheatfield Prison and Cloverhill Prison are two prisons near Clondalkin.

Microsoft, Google, Amazon, Arytza, Wyeth, Takeda and Pfizer all have significant data centres and development facilities in the Grange Castle Business Park.

In March 2014, Clondalkin became the 51st "Fairtrade town" in Ireland. Farmers from Belize and El Salvador, along with local councillors and community representatives, attended a ceremony in Clonburris National School to mark the occasion.

Transport
Clondalkin is served by public transport to Dublin city centre, to nearby suburbs, and to neighbouring settled areas such as Tallaght.

Dublin Bus provide bus routes including the 13, 68, 69, 151 and G2. There are also alternative bus routes provided by Go-Ahead Ireland such as the 76, 76A and L51. Many of these run from areas near Clondalkin, such as Rathcoole and Newcastle, into the city centre via Clondalkin. Some services, such as the 76 and 76A, do not service the city centre.

The Luas Red Line runs from the Red Cow interchange park and ride station providing links to the town square in Tallaght and Dublin city centre. However, the Luas station is approximately fifteen to twenty minutes' walk from Clondalkin village.

Clondalkin railway station opened on 4 August 1846 and was closed for goods traffic on 9 June 1947. It was reopened during the 1990s for commuter services. Commuter trains are operated by Iarnród Éireann (Irish Rail) and run between Heuston station in Dublin and Kildare Town in County Kildare. A new station, to replace rather than supplement the previous station, has been built at Fonthill, north of Bawnogue. The original Clondalkin station was demolished in 2008 to facilitate a four-line track, allowing express trains to pass through without affecting local services on the Kildare line.

Bus Éireann services stop to collect and set down passengers at Newlands Cross, on the N7 road near Clondalkin. These services have destinations all over the west and south of the country; services to the north do not pass Newlands Cross.

As of 2007, Clondalkin was included on the preferred route for the proposed Dublin Metro West line.

Media
Two local newspapers, the Clondalkin Echo and Clondalkin Gazette, serve the area. The latter is published by Gazette Group Newspapers (part-owned by the Irish Times), and was launched in October 2005.  The Clondalkin News is delivered free into households in Clondalkin.

Sport

GAA
The town's oldest sports club is the Round Towers GAA Club, which was founded in December 1884 and is located on Convent Road. Club members have represented Dublin in the inter-county competition since the nineteenth century, when Tom Errity won several All-Ireland Senior Football medals in the 1890s. More recently, Jim Gavin won an All-Ireland senior medal with Dublin in 1995 and several as a manager in the 2010s.

Soccer
The towns main association football team is Clondalkin Celtic F.C. formed in 1969 with teams competing in the Leinster Senior League, Dublin and District Schoolboys League.

The town's two main previous association football teams were Moyle Park Past Pupils FC, and Neilstown Rangers (past winners of the FAI Junior Cup). St Francis Boys FC have been at home at John Hyland Park, Baldonnel, close to Clondalkin since relocating from their original home in The Liberties.

Some other local teams include Booth Road Celtic, Castle Park F.C., Moorefield United, and Knockmitten United. The latter is a senior and schoolboy football club which was founded in 2008 with the amalgamation of Hillview and Monksfield.

Collinstown FC, Liffey Valley Rangers and Clondalkin Celtic F.C. are also emerging soccer clubs in the area.

Rugby
Rugby union is played at Clondalkin Rugby Club, Kingswood, who were winners of the 2006 Spencer Cup and 2006 Under-18 Premier League. The club was formed in 1973–74 and fields four senior teams and several underage and youth teams.

Boxing
Bernard Dunne the former WBA Super Bantamweight World Champion is from Neilstown in Clondalkin.

Kenny Egan, winner of a silver medal for boxing in the 2008 Olympics, comes from Clondalkin, originally Woodford estate.

Basketball
Dublin Lions Basketball Club has teams playing in Division 2, 3 and 4 of the Dublin Men Basketball League, teams in Senior 2, 5 and 6 of Dublin Ladies Basketball League. There are also children's teams and an academy for ages 4 to 10. The club is based between Coláiste Bride and Moyle Park College.

The National Baseball Facility in Ireland, O'Malley Field, is located in Corkagh Demesne Park, in southwest Clondalkin. This is the home of the Irish national baseball team.

Education
Clondalkin has primary and secondary schools of different denominations.

Among its primary schools are: Sacred heart of Shruleen, St. Ronans, Clonburris National School, Sacred Heart National School, St. Joseph's Boys National School, Scoil Íde, Scoil Áine,  St John's National School (Church of Ireland), Scoil Mhuire, Talbot S.N.S and Scoil Nano Nagle.

The secondary schools are: Moyle Park College (for boys), Deansrath Community College, Coláiste Bríde (for girls),  Collinstown Park Community College and St. Kevin's Community College.

Clondalkin also contains three Gaelscoileanna (Irish-language schools) – Gaelscoil Chluain Dolcáin and Gaelscoil na Camóige at primary level and  Coláiste Chilliain at second level.

Local organisations
Community organisations include a unit of Toastmasters International, an Order of Malta branch and several youth groups  including Clondalkin Youth Theatre (associated with the Irish National Association for Youth Drama).

The town is also home to St Joseph's Pipe band; Established in 1937, the band has won several All-Ireland Championship Titles. The Clondalkin Youth Band, also based locally, was founded in 1986.

Scouting Ireland meet in the Scout Hall most evenings. Boy's and Girl's Brigades, girl guides and Brownies meet at St John's Parish Hall. Local drama groups are Clondalkin Drama Group and Clondalkin Youth Theatre.

The Clondalkin Tidy Towns group started in 2012. They were awarded the South Dublin County Community Group of the Year 2012 and were also nominated for a Pride of Place award for 2012.

The Civil Defence established a unit in Deansrath during 2010. It specialises in auxiliary fire fighting, emergency medical services and swift-water technical rescue. A notable task assigned to the Clondalkin unit of Dublin Civil Defence was responding to flooded homes next to the Camac River in Clondalkin Village on 24 October 2011.

Irish language
Áras Chrónáin promotes Irish language and culture (e.g. music and dancing). Muintir Chrónáin have been awarded the main national Glór na nGael awards in 1978 and 1988 and hosted Oireachtas na Gaeilge in 1991. The national director of Oireachtas na Gaeilge is Liam Ó Maolaodha from Clondalkin. The grassroots Irish language project Pop-Up Gaeltacht was co-founded by Clondalkin native Peadar Ó Caomhánaigh.

There are an estimated 1,500 Irish-speaking pupils in Clondalkin, attending the two Gaelscoileanna (Irish language primary schools) and Gaelcholáiste (Irish language secondary school).

The idea of designation for Clondalkin as a Gaeltacht Network region was raised in 2012, based on proposed amendments to the definition of "Gaeltacht," to be "based on linguistic criteria instead of on geographic areas".

Politics and local government

Clondalkin is included in the Dublin Mid-West Dáil Éireann constituency. Four TDs were elected to Dáil Éireann in 2020 – two from Sinn Féin, one from People Before Profit and one from Fine Gael.

Clondalkin is mostly in the Clondalkin Local electoral area for county council elections (along with Rathcoole, Newcastle and Saggart), with parts in the Tallaght Central local electoral area.

People 

Karl Bermingham, footballer
Mic Christopher, singer-songwriter
Brendan Courtney, television presenter
Seán Dillon, footballer
Bernard Dunne, boxer
Corrina Durran, member of girlband Wonderland
Kenny Egan, boxer
Jim Gavin, footballer and manager
Mary Kennedy, television host 
Cathal Mac Coille, broadcaster and journalist
Sinéad Mulvey, singer, represented Ireland in the 2009 Eurovision Song Contest
Adrienne Murphy, model and Miss Universe Ireland 2012
Derek Murray, footballer
Graham Norton, comedian and presenter
Neil O'Donoghue, American footballer
Eoin Ó Murchú,   writer and journalist
Stephen Quinn, footballer
Dermot Ryan, Archbishop of Dublin (1972–1984)
Aidan Turner, actor
Katharine Tynan, novelist
Glenn Whelan footballer 
Arthur Wolfe, 1st Viscount Kilwarden
Simon Young, broadcaster

Climate
The climate in this area has mild differences between highs and lows, and there is adequate rainfall year-round.  The Köppen Climate Classification subtype for this climate is "Cfb" (Marine West Coast Climate/Oceanic climate).

References

External links

 Clondalkin on South Dublin County History website
 Clondalkin's Gaelscoils/Gaelcholáiste

 
Towns and villages in South Dublin (county)
Townlands of County Dublin
Towers in the Republic of Ireland
Civil parishes of Newcastle, County Dublin
Civil parishes of Uppercross